Vakkola is a village in Askola municipality in Eastern Uusimaa, Finland. It is located 5 kilometers northeast of Monninkylä along the Porvoo River, just a couple of kilometers from Askola's church village. In 2009, the Finnish Heritage Agency classified Vakkola village as a national cultural heritage site of national significance.

Vakkola is the birthplace of the author Johannes Linnankoski (1869–1913) and his childhood home serves as a home museum.

References 

Askola
Villages in Finland